Pixar Pal-A-Round (formerly known as the Sun Wheel and Mickey's Fun Wheel) is a  eccentric wheel at Disney California Adventure, at the Disneyland Resort in Anaheim, California. The attraction opened to the public on February 8, 2001 at Paradise Pier as the Sun Wheel. Inspired by Wonder Wheel at Deno's Wonder Wheel Amusement Park, Coney Island, which also features both sliding and fixed gondolas, Pixar Pal-A-Round has a large pie-eyed Mickey Mouse face at its center.

From 2001 to 2008, the attraction featured a sun face on the front along with a yellow color scheme. In 2008, the attraction was rethemed as the Mickey's Fun Wheel, which opened on May 4, 2009. The sun was replaced with a Mickey Mouse face, and images of Mickey, Goofy, Donald Duck, and Minnie Mouse were added to the gondolas. On November 2, 2017, Disney announced that the ride would be renovated, which would include Pixar characters on the gondolas, but with Mickey's face remaining on the side. On June 23, 2018, the attraction reopened as the Pixar Pal-A-Round.

Description
Pixar Pal-A-Round is an eccentric wheel, differing from conventional Ferris wheels in that 16 of its 24 gondolas ride on interior rails so that they slide inward and outward as the wheel rotates. This results in a more intense experience, and motion sickness bags are provided in each gondola due to the disorienting nature of the ride. The other eight gondolas are fixed to the rim of the wheel and do not slide. Guests may choose to ride in sliding or fixed gondolas, each of which can carry eight people.

Pixar Pal-A-Round features a Mickey Mouse head, but with gondolas themed after Pixar films such as Finding Nemo, The Incredibles, Inside Out, and Coco. From 2009 to 2018, the stationary cars featured Mickey, while the sliding ones featured Goofy, Donald Duck, and Minnie Mouse.

History

Sun Wheel (2001–08)

The attraction opened as the Sun Wheel on February 8, 2001, and was one of the park’s earliest attractions during opening day. It was modeled after Coney Island's 1920 Wonder Wheel, and featured a sun on the front side along with a yellow color scheme. The purple and orange cars rode on inside rails, which means that they were sliding towards the inside and outside as the ride revolved. The sun face was inspired by Mexican art from the 1970s. In October 2008, the Sun Wheel underwent renovation and was re-themed as the Mickey's Fun Wheel.

Mickey's Fun Wheel (2009–18)
Although the ride experience hasn't changed, the sun was replaced by a Mickey Mouse head and the color scheme was changed from yellow to red. The attraction re-opened on May 4, 2009 as the Mickey's Fun Wheel.

In 2013, lights were installed around the back of Mickey's Head for World of Color: Winter Dreams along with an LED lighting package that was installed on the California Screamin' roller coaster. Creative executive Steve Davison revealed during an interview after the premiere of Winter Dreams that the new lights installed on Fun Wheel and California Screamin' are a permanent addition and will be used in future World of Color updates.

On October 2, 2014, the ride malfunctioned, stranding riders for two hours before they were evacuated with no reported injuries.

Pixar Pal-A-Round (2018–present) 
On November 2, 2017, Disney announced that Mickey's Fun Wheel would be updated to include Pixar characters on the gondolas with Mickey's face remaining on the side facing Paradise Bay. The attraction was closed on January 8, 2018, along with other Paradise Pier offerings, as the land transformed into Pixar Pier. On April 25, 2018, Disney announced that Mickey's Fun Wheel would be renamed "Pixar Pal-A-Round," to be consistent with the attraction's new theme. The color scheme was changed yet again to light blue, and the gondolas received new images of characters from Pixarfilms, such as Joy & Sadness from Inside Out, Mr. Incredible & Elastigirl from The Incredibles, and Miguel & Héctor from Coco. The attraction officially opened on June 23, 2018.

On February 3, 2019, Pixar Pal-A-Round was lit up in blue and yellow for Super Bowl LIII, which featured the Los Angeles Rams and the New England Patriots.

Reception
The non-swinging portion of Pixar Pal-A-Round received a 4.66 average score out of 10, while the swinging portion received a 1.33 average score. The swinging gondolas have been described as "terrifying" and "a one-of-a-kind-experience." In May 2019, the ride was ranked as the 24th best attraction in the park out of 25 by the Time Out magazine. A reviewer on Your USA City Guide described it as "far scarier than it seems."

The Mickey's Fun Wheel had been ranked as the second best ferris wheel in the world by Fodor's in June 2017. In December 2014, Paste magazine editor Garrett Martin ranked the ride as the sixth best attraction in the park.

References

External links

Amusement rides introduced in 2001
Amusement rides that closed in 2008
Amusement rides introduced in 2009
Amusement rides that closed in 2018
Amusement rides introduced in 2018
Walt Disney Parks and Resorts attractions
Disney California Adventure
Ferris wheels in the United States
Mickey Mouse
Paradise Pier
Pixar Pier
2001 establishments in California